Mahdi Quli is a male given name meaning 'slave of the Mahdi'. It is built from quli.

People
 Mahdi Quli Khan Hidayat (1863–1955)
 Mahdi Quli Khan Shamlu
 Mehdigulu Khan Javanshir (1763 or 1772–1845)
 Mehdigulu Khan Vafa (1855–1900)

Masculine given names